The South African Handball Federation (SAHF) is the governing body for handball in South Africa and is responsible for the administration of the South African national handball teams (both men's and women's). SAHF has been an affiliate of International Handball Federation, African Handball Confederation and Commonwealth Handball Association since 1993, and its offices are located in Johannesburg, the elected president is Ally Pole. SAHF is registered with SASCOC as the officially recognised federation.

See also
 South Africa men's national handball team
 South Africa women's national handball team

References

External links
 Official website

African Handball Confederation
Handball
Organisations based in Johannesburg
Handball in South Africa
Sports organizations established in 1993
1993 establishments in South Africa